Huhta is a surname. Notable people with the surname include: 

Jean-Louis Huhta (born 1965), Swedish musician, drummer, producer, and DJ
Mira Huhta (born 1987), Finnish ice hockey player

See also
Huta (disambiguation)